"Old Skool Love" is a song by Canadian R&B/Soul singer Divine Brown. Released in March 2005 as the lead single from her self-titled debut album, the single was successful in Canada, reaching the top 10 in several different categories.

Song meaning
The song is about a love she had met at a party in June. And how she misses the love she gave and received yet she does not want him back. It is also about how she has found a new love but she can not stop thinking about her previous love affair.

Music video
The music video accompanying the song was released and features Divine Brown singing and recalling the good and bad times of a previous relationship.

Covers
Canadian Idol winner Eva Avila performed the song on Canadian Idol during the Top 4.

Charts

References

Old Skool Love Lyrics
Divine Brown - Old Skool Love (Music Video)
Eva Avila - Old Skool Love (Divine Brown Cover)

2005 songs
Divine Brown songs
2005 debut singles